The Treaty of Surji-Anjangaon was signed on 30 December 1803 between the British and Daulat Rao Sindhia, chief of the Maratha Confederacy at Anjangaon town located in Maharashtra.

On 30 December 1803, the Sindhia signed the Treaty of Surji-Anjangaon with the British after the Battle of Assaye and Battle of Argaon. The agreement was the result of Major General Arthur Wellesley's military campaigns in Central India in the first phase of the Second Anglo-Maratha War (1803-1805). As a result of this treaty, Ganges-Jumna Doab, Haryana, the Delhi-Agra region, parts of Bundelkhand, Broach, some districts of Gujarat and fort of Ahmadnagar, eventually came under the control of the British East India Company.

The treaty was revised twice (once in November 1805 and again on 5 November 1817). The first revision mostly entailed restoring the territories of Gwalior and Gohad to Sindhia. The second revision of the treaty entailed granting Sindhia more power in return for providing help to the British in their fight against the Pindaris in the Third Anglo-Maratha War.

See also
List of treaties

References

External links
Encyclopædia Britannica Online: Treaty of Surji-Anjangaon

1803 treaties
Surji-Anjangaon
History of Gwalior
Second Anglo-Maratha War
December 1803 events